Charibert (also spelled Caribert and Heribert), Count of Laon, was the maternal grandfather of Charlemagne. He was the father of Charles's mother, Bertrada of Laon. 

Only his mother, Bertrada of Prüm, is known from contemporary records as the two signed the foundation act of the Abbey of Prüm in 721. The same year, also with his mother, he made a donation to the Abbey of Echternach. Charibert's father possibly was Martin of Laon.

The name of Charibert's wife is not known.  He had at least two daughters: 
Bertrada of Laon, who married Pippin the Younger, mayor of the palace of Neustria and Burgundy and later king of the Franks.
Gerberge, who married of Lambert de Treves von Hornbach. 

Charibert died before 762, as stated in an act of his daughter and son-in-law.

References

Sources
 Settipani, Christian, Les Ancêtres de Charlemagne, Paris, 1989
 Settipani, Christian, Addendum to the Ancestors of Charlemagne, 1990 (PDF)

8th-century deaths
Year of birth unknown